Muhammad Khan was a son of Khizr Khoja and was Khan of Moghulistan from 1408 to 1415.
 
Muhammad Khan's brothers included Shams-i-Jahan. After Esen Buqa Khan, excepting Tughlugh Timur Khan, there was no one left in the country of the Moghuls who was of the first rank of Khákáns. After the death of Tughlugh Timur, Amir Kamaruddin murdered all of Tughlugh's sons, so that there was no one left but Khizr Khwaja Khan. This last Khan left many sons and grandsons; the details of the lives of all of them have not, however, been preserved in the Moghul traditions.
 
In the Moghul records it is stated that Amir Khudaidad himself raised six Khans to the Khanate, and Muhammad Khan was one of them.
 
Muhammad Khan built a Rabát on the northern side of the defile of Chádir Kul. In the construction of this building he employed stones of great size, the like of which are only to be seen in the temples [Imárát] of Kashmir. The Rabát contains an entrance hall 20 gaz* in height. When you enter by the main door, you turn to the right hand along a passage which measures 30 gaz. You then come to a dome which is about 20 gaz, and beautifully proportioned. There is a passage round the dome, and in the sides of it; and in the passage itself are beautiful cells. On the western side there is also a mosque 15 gaz in height, which has more than twenty doors. The whole building is of stone, and over the doors there are huge solid blocks of stone, which I thought very wonderful, before I had seen the temples in Kashmir. He was succeeded by Sher Muhammad as Khan of Moghulistan.

Genealogy

In Baburnama, Babur described the genealogy of his maternal grandfather Yunas Khan as:

"Yunas Khan descended from Chaghatai Khan, the second
son of Chingiz Khan (as follows,) Yunas Khan, son of Wais
Khan, son of Sher-'ali Aughlon, son of Muhammad Khan, son
of Khizr Khwaja Khan, son of Tughluq-timur Khan, son of
Aisan-bugha Khan, son of Dawa Khan, son of Baraq Khan,
son of Yesuntawa Khan, son of Muatukan, son of Chaghatai
Khan, son of Chingiz Khan"

References 

15th-century Mongol rulers
1415 deaths
Date of birth missing
Chagatai khans